Androgna (Angrogna in Italian) is a surname of Italian nobility. The name may refer to:

 Carlo Manfredi Luserna d'Angrogna, (1508/10–1572), signore d'Angrogna, count of Luserna, and Governor of Vercelli
 Emanuele Filiberto Manfredi Luserna d'Angrogna, (c.1557 – 1616), Military commander  
 Caterina Manfredi, (1590–1598), Contessa di Luserna dei Marchesi d'Angrogna 
Alessandro Manfredi Luserna d'Angrogna, (1800–1867), Italian General and nobleman 
Anna d'Androgna Pallavicini, (1840–1922), Marchesa and patron of the arts
Emilio d'Androgna Pallavicini (1823–1901), general and senator who defeated Garibaldi at the battle of Aspromonte
  The Marquis of Androgna - A title of Italian nobility

See also 
 Manfredi family
Pallavicini family
List of Italian Marquisates

References

Italian-language surnames
Italian nobility